John Harley may refer to:

John Harley (bishop, died 1558) (died 1558), earlier bishop of Hereford
John Harley (bishop, died 1788) (1728–1788), dean of Windsor and bishop of Hereford
John Pritt Harley (1786–1858), English comic actor
John Harley (physician) (1833–1921), English physician, geologist, and botanist
John Harley (footballer) (1886–1960), Scottish-born Uruguayan footballer
John Brian Harley (1932–1991), geographer, cartographer, and map historian
John B. Harley (died 1846), president of Fordham University, 1843–1845
Jack Harley (John Laker Harley, 1911–1990), British biologist